The 2018 European Road Championships and European Track Championships were held in Glasgow, United Kingdom, from 2 to 12 August 2018, the championships were part of the first European Championships with other six sports events happening in Glasgow and Berlin.

In 2018 for the first time the European championships of four cycling specialties (Road, Track, BMX and Mountain bike), were held in a single period and a single venue, and the events were part of the program of the first edition of the European Championships.

Schedule and titles
Competition dates by discipline and titles are.

Overall medal table
In the table the official medal table of the 2018 European Championships.

Track

 Notes 
 Competitors named in italics only participated in rounds prior to the final.
 These events are not contested in the Olympics.
 In the Olympics, these events are contested within the omnium only.

Medal table

Road

Medal table

Mountain bike

Medal table

BMX

Medal table

See also
 Union Européenne de Cyclisme

References

External links

Union Européenne de Cyclisme official web site
Results book − Track Cycling 
Results book − Road Cycling 
Results book − Mountain Bike 
Results book − BMX 

2018
Cycling
European Cyclung Championships
International sports competitions in Glasgow
European Cycling Championships